Catalan Braille is the braille alphabet of the Catalan language. It is very close to French Braille: it uses the 26 letters of the basic braille alphabet, plus several additional letters for ç and what are, in print, vowel letters with diacritics; these differ from their French values only in the need to accommodate the Catalan acute accent: ú, ó, í for what are in French Braille ù, œ, ì :

{| class="wikitable" style="line-height: 1.2"
|- align=center
|  ç
|  à
|  é
|  è
|  í
|  ï
|  ó
|  ò
|  ú
|  ü
|}

Print digraphs are written as digraphs in braille as well.

Punctuation

Formatting

See also
Abecedari Braille de 1931, a 1931 alphabet with different letter assignments and punctuation, including dropped digits for ordinal numbers.

References

UNESCO (2013) World Braille Usage , 3rd edition.

French-ordered braille alphabets
Catalan language